Latropiscis purpurissatus, the sergeant baker or Dragon Snapper, is a species of flagfin endemic to Australia. The Australian Museum suggests that the sergeant baker is named after Sergeant William Baker who served as Admiral Arthur Phillip's orderly sergeant. He may have been the first colonist to catch this fish species. Sergeant Baker sailed to Australia aboard the transport ship Charlotte as a Corporal of Marines.

Sergeant bakers are commonly found in Australia's warm southern waters between Queensland and Western Australia, dwelling on the bottom of coastal and deep-reef environments. They readily take bait or lures, but are generally considered poor eating.

References
 

Aulopiformes
Monotypic fish genera
Marine fish of Australia
Fish described in 1843